Little Wing is a 2016 Finnish-Danish drama film directed by Selma Vilhunen. It was screened in the Discovery section at the 2016 Toronto International Film Festival. It won the 2017 Nordic Council Film Prize.

Cast
 Linnea Skog as Varpu Miettinen
 Paula Vesala as Siru Miettinen
 Lauri Maijala as Varpu's father
 Santtu Karvonen as Bo
 Antti Luusuaniemi as Ilmari Hukkanen
 Niina Sillanpää as Emilia Hukkanen
 Outi Mäenpää as Riding Instructor

References

External links

2016 drama films
2016 films
Danish drama films
Films set in Finland
Films shot in Finland
Finnish drama films
2010s Finnish-language films